This is a list of notable people from Cheb or Eger.

A
Bernhard Adler (1753–1810), German-Bohemian doctor and founder of the spa town Franzensbad in Egerland
Hans Hermann Adler (1891–1956), German journalist and professor at the University of Heidelberg
Pavel Anděl (born 1966), Czech actor, musician, writer, editor and television presenter

B
 (born 1951), Czechoslovak-Austrian writer
 (1942–2006), German historian, Slavic scholar and translator
 (born 1965), Czech sports commentator and journalist
 (before 1638–1670), cantor at St. Nicholas, composer, author of Ave Maria zart
Bretislav III (–1197), Czech prince and bishop of Prague's Přemyslid dynasty
 (1512–1589), German bookbinder and bookseller, author of the city history and family chronicles
 (1518–1559), German humanist, poet and, historian, went to school in Eger
 (1832–1907), German military doctor, spa doctor, honorary citizen of Eger and Franzensbad

C
 (1914–1980), Czech writer and dramatist
Mikoláš Chadima (born 1952), Czech musician
Pablo Clain (also known as Pavel Klein and Paul Klein; 1652–1717), German-Czech Jesuit
Ilona Csáková (born 1970), Czech singer

D
Albin Dötsch (1872–1922), Austrian politician (SDAP)
Libor Dvořák (born 1948), Czech journalist and Russian translator

E
Johannes Sylvius Egranus (Johannes Wildauer; around 1480–1553), German theologian, humanist and reformer, friend of Martin Luther
 (1648–1725), German-Bohemian doctor and lawyer, Rector of Charles University, went to Eger to school

F
Martin Fenin (born 1987), Czech footballer
Adolf Fischer (born 1925), German family and local historian, went to school in Eger

G
Peter Glotz (1939–2005), German SPD politician, journalist and media scholar, and member of the German Bundestag
 (1842–1895), German historian and archivist of Eger
 (born 1946), Czech astronomer and writer in the field of astronomy and astronautics
 (1780–1864), superintendent and local historian of Eger
 (1814–1874), Austro-Hungarian politician

H
Johann Habermann (1516–1590), German Lutheran theologian and devotional writer
 (1792–1861), Franzensbad spa entrepreneur and politician
 (1483–1511), German sculptor and painter
 (1761–1836), executioner, healer and collector

I

J
Ladislav Jakl (born 1959), Secretary of the President of the Czech Republic
Wilhelm Jobst (1912–1947), German physician and Nazi chief conductor

K
Daniela Kolářová (born 1946), Czech actress
Andrej Krob (born 1938), Czech theater director and screenwriter

L
 (1919–1999), German sculptor and photographer
 (ca. 1639–1701), mason and builder, built the Dominican church and monastery in Cheb

M
Johann Georg Macasius (1617–1653), German physician
 (1884–1954), German sculptor and ceramic artist
 (1502–1551), German theologian, reformer, and mathematician
 (1895–1969), Czech museum and archive manager
Michael Müller (1849–1914), German physician and local historian

N
Balthasar Neumann (1687–1753), German baroque architect
Pavel Nedvěd (born 1972), European Footballer of the Year for 2004
 (1666–1742), German Roman Catholic lawyer and syndic of Eger

O

P

Q

R
Erich Riedl (born 1933), German CSU politician, member of the German Bundestag

S
Adolf Scherbaum (1909–2000), German trumpeter
 (1628–1683), German Protestant theologian
 (ca. 1396–1449), Chancellor of three kings and Chancellor under Emperor Sigismund, a politically important personality of the first half of the 15th century
 (1930–1992), German organist and composer
 (born 1944), German internist, psychoanalyst and sociologist
Rudolf Serkin (1903–1991), American pianist of Russian-Jewish origin
 (born 1936), German politician (FDP)
 (1851–1943), historian, German city archivist and museum director
Norbert Singer (born 1939), German automotive engineer responsible for many of Porsche's victories at the 24 Hours of Le Mans races
 (~1300–1364/1368), Viscount of Eger
 Hans Stanka (1864–1936), President of the Deutsche Feuerwehr in Böhmen (German fire department in Bohemia)
 (1807–1888), Fountain doctor and honorary citizen of Franzensbad and Eger
 (1904–1981), German city archivist and museum director

T
Adolf Tachezy (1814–1892), Czech businessman, pharmacist and politician, mayor
Stanislav Tůma (1950–2005), Czech photographer

U
Josef Ulbrich (1843–1910), Austrian law expert

V

W
Albrecht von Wallenstein (1583–1634), Bohemian military leader and politician during the Thirty Years' War
 (1887–?), German sculptor
 (1915–1972), Sudeten German sculptor
 (born 1944), German actress, widow of Bernhard Wicki
Johannes Widmann (1460–after 1498), German mathematician
Karl Wilfert (1879–1932), German sculptor
 (1822–?), Austrian historian
 (born 1933), German physicist
 (1862–1941), journalist and German national politician

X

Y

Z
Hugo Zuckermann (1881–1914), German Jewish writer

Lists of people by city

Cheb
Cheb